Pterodromoides minoricensis is an extinct fulmarine petrel dating from the Late Miocene. Its fossil remains were found at the Punta Nati palaeontological site on the island of Menorca in the Balearic archipelago of the western Mediterranean. It was described in 2001, with the authors justifying the creation of a new genus by the large orbitonasal opening and characters of the postcranial skeleton, despite the similarity of the cranial osteology to that of Pagodroma. The generic name derives from its resemblance to Pterodroma in shape and proportions. The specific epithet refers to the type locality.

References

Miocene birds
Prehistoric birds of Europe
Bird genera
Procellariidae
Fossil taxa described in 2001
Fauna of the Balearic Islands
Environment of Menorca
Prehistoric bird genera
History of Menorca
Extinct monotypic bird genera